was a Japanese artistic gymnast who won two world titles and seven Olympic medals.

At the 1952 Summer Olympics he won the silver medal in the vault with a score of 19.150, which was 0.050 short of the gold medal. Two years later he became world champion in the floor exercise, sharing the first placed with Valentin Muratov; he also won a silver medal with the Japanese team and a bronze at the parallel bars. At the 1956 Summer Olympics Takemoto won three bronze medals: in the horizontal bar, parallel bars and rings; he also received a silver medal as part of the Japanese team. His main skills were on the floor exercise and he proved it once again at the 1958 World Artistic Gymnastics Championships, where he successfully defended his title; he also won silver medals in the vault and team event, as well as a bronze medal in the horizontal bar. At the 1960 Summer Olympics Takemoto won a team gold medal and placed second in the horizontal bar.

Takemoto had a degree in physical education from Nippon Sport Science University and later coached the national gymnastics team. In 1997 he was inducted into the International Gymnastics Hall of Fame. He died from cholangiocarcinoma on 2 February 2007 at the age of 87 in Kanagawa.

References

External links

 
 

1919 births
2007 deaths
Japanese male artistic gymnasts
Gymnasts at the 1952 Summer Olympics
Gymnasts at the 1956 Summer Olympics
Gymnasts at the 1960 Summer Olympics
Olympic gymnasts of Japan
Olympic gold medalists for Japan
Olympic silver medalists for Japan
Olympic bronze medalists for Japan
World champion gymnasts
Medalists at the World Artistic Gymnastics Championships
Deaths from cholangiocarcinoma
Deaths from cancer in Japan
Nippon Sport Science University alumni
Olympic medalists in gymnastics
Medalists at the 1960 Summer Olympics
Medalists at the 1956 Summer Olympics
Medalists at the 1952 Summer Olympics
20th-century Japanese people
21st-century Japanese people